Vadamadurai is a state assembly constituency in Dindigul district in Tamil Nadu, India.

Tamil Nadu State

Madras State

Election results

1971

1967

1962

1957

1952

References

External links
 

Dindigul district
Former assembly constituencies of Tamil Nadu